Paduka Sri Sultan Ibrahim Shah ibni al-Marhum Sultan Mahmud Shah I (died 9 August 1373) was the sixth Sultan of Kedah. His reign was from 1321 to 1373. He established his capital at Kota Seputih in May 1323.

External links
 List of Sultans of Kedah

1373 deaths
14th-century Sultans of Kedah